The Mansi (Mansi: Мāньси / Мāньси мāхум, Māńsi / Māńsi māhum) are a Ugric indigenous people living in Khanty–Mansia, an autonomous okrug within Tyumen Oblast in Russia. In Khanty–Mansia, the Khanty and Mansi languages have co-official status with Russian. The Mansi language is one of the postulated Ugric languages of the Uralic family. The Mansi people were formerly known as the Voguls.

Together with the Khanty people, the Mansi are politically represented by the Association to Save Yugra, an organisation founded during Perestroika of the late 1980s. This organisation was among the first regional indigenous associations in Russia.

Demographics

According to the 2021 census, there were 12,228 Mansi in Russia.

History

The ancestors of Mansi people populated the areas west of the Urals. Mansi findings have been unearthed in the vicinity of Perm.

In the first millennium BC, they migrated to Western Siberia where they assimilated with the native inhabitants. According to others they are originated from the south Ural steppe and moved into their current location about 500 AD.

The Mansi have been in contact with the Russian state at least since the 16th century when most of western Siberia was brought under Russian control by Yermak Timofeyevich. Due to their higher exposure to Russian and Soviet control, they are generally more assimilated than their northern neighbours, the Khanty.

Culture 
The Mansi were semi-nomadic hunters and fishermen. Some Mansi also raised reindeer. A few Mansi engaged in agriculture (cultivating barley) and raised cattle and horses.

During the winter, the Mansi lived in stationary huts made out of earth and branches at permanent villages. During the spring, the Mansi moved towards hunting and fishing grounds, where they constructed temporary rectangular-shaped shelters out of birch-bark and poles.

Weapons used by the Mansi were advanced for the period and included longbows, arrows, spears, and the use of iron helmets and chain mail.

Notable Mansi
Matrena Vakhrusheva (1918–2000), linguist, philologist, writer; co-wrote the first Mansi-Russian dictionary
Yuvan Shestalov (1937–2011), writer
Ruslan Provodnikov (b. 1984), boxer (Mansi mother)
Sergey Ustiugov (b. 1992), cross-country skier (Mansi father)

References

External links

The Mansis
Dr Gabor Szekely's 1st visit to the Mansis
Dr Gabor Szekely's 2nd visit to the Mansis
The History of the Mansi

 
Mansi
Ethnic groups in Russia
Indigenous peoples of North Asia
Nomadic groups in Eurasia
Ugric peoples
Modern nomads
Indigenous small-numbered peoples of the North, Siberia and the Far East
History of Ural